Tomas Dering was MP for Petersfield from  1563 to April 1571.

References

People from Petersfield
English MPs 1563–1567